Makhado Local Municipality is located in the Vhembe District Municipality of Limpopo province, South Africa. The seat of Makhado Local Municipality Louis Trichardt.

Main places
The 2001 census divided the municipality into the following main places: The population census is just an estimate, there are close to 1-million Tsonga speakers in Gauteng alone, as well as close to 300 000 Venda speakers, also in Gauteng, who are there for work purposes only and have their homes in Limpopo, both the Tsonga and the Venda population are larger should the census count be done during December holiday.

Politics 

The municipal council consists of seventy-five members elected by mixed-member proportional representation. Thirty-eight councillors are elected by first-past-the-post voting in thirty-eight wards, while the remaining thirty-seven are chosen from party lists so that the total number of party representatives is proportional to the number of votes received. In the election of 1 November 2021 the African National Congress (ANC) won a majority of sixty-two seats on the council.
The following table shows the results of the election.

References

External links 
 Official homepage

Local municipalities of the Vhembe District Municipality